The 2008 Australian Formula Ford Championship was a CAMS sanctioned motor racing title for drivers of Formula Ford racing cars. The championship was contested over an eight-round series with three races per round.

Race calendar and results
 Round 1, Eastern Creek International Raceway, New South Wales, 7–9 March
 Round 2, Wakefield Park Raceway, New South Wales, 4–6 April
 Round 3, Sandown International Motor Raceway, Victoria, 7–9 June
 Round 4, Hidden Valley Raceway, Northern Territory, 4–6 July
 Round 5, Queensland Raceway, Ipswich, Queensland, 18–20 July
 Round 6, Phillip Island Grand Prix Circuit, Victoria, 12–14 September
 Round 7, Symmons Plains International Raceway, Tasmania, 21–23 September
 Round 8, Oran Park Motorsport Circuit, New South Wales, 5–7 December

Championship points were awarded on a 20-16-14-12-10-8-6-4-2-1 basis to the top ten finishers in each race and a bonus point was awarded to the driver achieving pole position for the first race at each round.

Drivers' championship standings

Note:
 Race 1 of Round 8 was abandoned after an accident and no championship points were awarded.
 Nick Percat's Round 6 total includes a 20-point penalty for a driving infringement
 Jack Chapman's Round 7 total includes a 15-point penalty for a driving infringement
 Scott Pye's Round 7 total includes a 15-point penalty for a driving infringement
 Chaz Mostert's Round 4 total includes a 5-point penalty for a driving infringement
 Robert Munnerley's Round 1 total includes a 10-point penalty for a driving infringement

References

External links
 Race Results Archive for 2008 Retrieved from www.natsoft.com.au on 8 January 2008

Australian Formula Ford Championship seasons
Formula Ford